Crosta is an Italian surname that may refer to:

Álvaro Penteado Crósta, Brazilian geologist 
Daniele Crosta (born 1970), Italian fencer 
Giancarlo Crosta (born 1934), Italian rower
Luca Crosta (born 1998), Italian football goalkeeper 

Italian-language surnames